Allan Dias (born 17 December 1986 in Mumbai, Maharashtra) is an Indian footballer who currently plays for Air India FC in the Elite Division of WIFA as a midfielder.

Playing career
At a very young age, Allan started playing football for Jolly Boys F.C., a local club started by his brother, Lawrence Dias, former Air India FC and Mahindra United F.C. starlet, in Sahar Village, a small place in Mumbai where he and his elder brother grew up. Determined hard work and rigorous training helped Allan achieve at various levels in private tournaments held all over the city. Allan's hard work paid off and Air India FC was aware of the progress made by the youngster. In 2006, Air India FC signed the youngster to compete at the highest level of Indian football. Since then Allan Dias has shown great progress on the field. The lad put up his name on the scoresheet many times since then. A number of clubs have been monitoring his situation at Air India, looking for a transfer, one of them rumored to be Mumbai F.C. The Sahar wonderboy took a great leap, from playing for his brothers club to captaining Air India FC.
In 2014 he joined Mumbai F.C. and left the club after its dismissal in 2017.

In 2021, Allan Dias joined Ambernath United Atlanta FC.

References

External links
 

1986 births
Living people
Indian footballers
I-League players
Footballers from Mumbai
Air India FC players
Mumbai FC players
Association football midfielders